Saturnian (subtitled Solo Saxophones, Volume 1) is a live solo album by saxophonist David S. Ware, who plays the saxello, stritch and tenor saxophone which was recorded in 2009 and released on the AUM Fidelity label.

Reception

In his review for AllMusic, Michael G. Nastos said "These three pieces flow beautifully, not in the strictest angelic, pretty, or peaceful fashion, but with the clear, assured dignity and confidence Ware has always displayed. It's not intended for garden-variety jazz listeners, but for fans and those aware of the gifts of this giant-stepping innovator in modern creative music". 

The All About Jazz review noted "Ware may be best known for his quartet work, it's clear that this is but one facet of his overarching vision. He expands his instrumental arsenal here to take in the saxello and the stritch, as well as his customary tenor sax, and the album's three pieces pan out in that order".

Track listing
All compositions by David S. Ware
 "Methone" - 14:24
 "Pallene" - 12:37
 "Anthe" - 11:41

Personnel
David S. Ware – saxello (track 1), stritch (track 2), tenor saxophone (track 3)

References

2010 live albums
David S. Ware live albums
AUM Fidelity live albums